The 1947 Oklahoma Sooners football team represented the University of Oklahoma in the 1947 college football season. In their first year under head coach Bud Wilkinson, the Sooners compiled a 7–2–1 record (4–0–1 against conference opponents), finished in a tie for first place in the Big Six Conference championship, and outscored their opponents by a combined total of 194 to 161.

Guard Buddy Burris received All-America honors in 1947, and five Sooners received all-conference honors: Burris, Jack Mitchell (back), John Rapacz (center), Jim Tyree (end), and Wade Walker (tackle).

Schedule

Roster
QB Darrell Royal, So.

Rankings

Postseason

NFL Draft
The following players were drafted into the National Football League following the season.

References

Oklahoma
Oklahoma Sooners football seasons
Big Eight Conference football champion seasons
Oklahoma Sooners football